I Can See Your Voice Thailand is a Thai television mystery music game show series based on the South Korean programme of the same name. It features a group of "mystery singers", with the objective of guest artist(s) are to eliminate potential bad singers, assisted by clues and celebrity panelists; and the game ends with a duet between the last remaining mystery singer and one of the guest artist(s).

Overall, the series has played 262 guest artists that aired five seasons with 313 episodes on Workpoint TV (from its debut on 13 January 2016 to 23 February 2022). In the milestones,  played in the 100th episode on 31 January 2018;  defeated Yingyong Yodbuangam under battle format in the 200th episode on 8 January 2020; and Apiwat Eurthavornsuk played in the 300th episode on 19 January 2022.

Unlike other local adaptations that air seasons separately, the Thai counterpart is unique known for uninterrupted, seasonal broadcasts. Also, the third season did run for two years (from 21 November 2018 to 28 October 2020), making it the longest season in ICSYV franchise by duration. It also aired the first episode played by a foreign guest artist.

Series overview

Episodes

Season 1 (2016—17)

Season 2 (2017—18)

Season 3 (2018—20)

Season 4 (2020—21)

Season 5 (2021—22)

Specials

Notes

References

I Can See Your Voice Thailand
Lists of Thai television series episodes